Oleg Yuryevich Rozin (born 5 July 1965) is a former Russian professional footballer.

Club career
He made his professional debut in the Soviet Second League in 1985 for FC Dynamo Leningrad. He played 4 games in the UEFA Cup 1994–95 for FC Tekstilshchik Kamyshin.

References

1965 births
Footballers from Saint Petersburg
Living people
Soviet footballers
Russian footballers
Association football midfielders
Association football defenders
Russian Premier League players
FC Tekstilshchik Kamyshin players
FC Lada-Tolyatti players
FC Dynamo Saint Petersburg players
FC Neftekhimik Nizhnekamsk players
FC Dynamo Bryansk players
FC Lukhovitsy players
FC Zenit Saint Petersburg players